Christophe Sercu (born 16 October 1970) is a Belgian cycling manager, who currently works as the general manager of UCI ProTeam .

He is the son of former cycling champion Patrick Sercu. He is involved in organizing some cycling races.

From 2000 until 2004, he was General Manager of the  cycling teams.

References

External links
Profile on Sport Vlaanderen–Baloise website

Cycle racing in Belgium
Living people
Place of birth missing (living people)
1970 births
Directeur sportifs